Car and Driver 10Best is a list annually produced by Car and Driver (C/D) beginning in 1983, nominating what it considers the ten best cars of the year. C/D also produced the 5Best list, highlighting what it considers the five best trucks of the year.

All production vehicles for sale in that calendar year are considered with these recent restrictions:
 The vehicle must be on sale by January
 It must be priced below 2.5 times the average price of a car that year
 The manufacturer must provide an example for testing
 Only substantially changed or new vehicles and the past year's 10 best winners are nominated

The magazine sometimes selects a specific trim and other times a whole family of vehicles.

Top Ten Marques
From 1983 through 2023, the following marques were represented on the list the most times, including the 10Best Cars, 5Best Trucks, and 10Best Trucks and SUVs lists.

Top Models
From the start of the 10Best in 1983 through 2023, the following models were represented on the 10Best lists the most years.

1983
For the 1980s, Car and Driver picked four domestic and six import cars.

Fastest car tested: Jaguar XJ-S HE, 142 mph

Top-selling cars:
 Oldsmobile Cutlass Supreme
 Ford Escort
 Ford LTD

1984
Instituted the price cap at $30,000.

Fastest car tested: Ferrari 308 Quattrovalvole, 144 mph

Top-selling cars:
 Chevrolet Cavalier
 Ford Escort
 Ford LTD

1985
Price cap: $30,000

Fastest car tested: Chevrolet Corvette, 150 mph

Top-selling cars:
 Chevrolet Cavalier
 Ford Escort
 Chevrolet Celebrity

1986
Price cap: $30,000

Fastest car tested: Porsche 944 Turbo, 157 mph

Top-selling cars:
 Chevrolet Celebrity
 Ford Escort
 Chevrolet Cavalier

1987
Price cap: $30,000

Fastest car tested: Ferrari Testarossa, 176 mph

Top-selling cars:
 Ford Escort
 Ford Taurus
 Chevrolet Cavalier

1988
Price cap: $35,000

Fastest car tested: Ferrari Testarossa, 173 mph

Top-selling cars:
 Ford Escort
 Chevrolet Corsica/Beretta
 Ford Taurus

1989
Imports and domestics chosen by marque, not by place of manufacture.

Price cap: $35,000

Fastest car tested: 750iL V12, 158 mph

Top-selling cars:
 Honda Accord
 Ford Taurus
 Ford Escort

1990
Eliminated half domestic/half import rule as impractical.

Price cap: $35,000

Fastest car tested: Chevrolet Corvette ZR-1, 175 mph

Top-selling cars:
 Honda Accord
 Ford Taurus
 Chevrolet Cavalier

1991
New rule: No more than two places per marque.

Price cap: $35,000

Fastest car tested: Chevrolet Corvette ZR-1, 176 mph

Top-selling cars:
 Honda Accord
 Ford Taurus
 Toyota Camry

1992
Price cap: $40,000

Fastest car tested: Ferrari F40, 197 mph

Top-selling cars:
 Ford Taurus
 Honda Accord
 Toyota Camry

1993
Price cap: $40,000

Fastest car tested: Lamborghini Diablo, 204 mph

Top-selling cars:
 Ford Taurus
 Honda Accord
 Toyota Camry

1994
Institution of the 2.5x price cap, now at $43,000.

Fastest car tested: Chevrolet Corvette ZR-1, 179 mph

Top-selling cars:
 Ford Taurus
 Honda Accord
 Ford Escort

1995
Price cap: $46,000.

Fastest car tested: Lamborghini Diablo VT, 185 mph

Top-selling cars:
 Ford Taurus
 Honda Accord
 Toyota Camry

1996
Price cap: $48,000

Fastest car tested: Ferrari F355, 179 mph

Top-selling cars:
 Ford Taurus
 Honda Accord
 Toyota Camry

1997
Price cap: $54,000

Fastest car tested: Dodge Viper GTS, 177 mph

Top-selling cars:
 Toyota Camry
 Honda Accord
 Ford Taurus

1998
Price cap: $55,000

Fastest car tested: Ferrari F50, 194 mph

Top-selling cars:
 Toyota Camry
 Honda Accord
 Ford Taurus

1999
Price cap: $59,000

Top-selling cars:
 Toyota Camry
 Honda Accord
 Ford Taurus

2000
Price cap: $61,000

Top-selling cars:
 Toyota Camry
 Honda Accord
 Ford Taurus

2001
For 2001, Car and Driver created a separate "Five Best Trucks" award with a single winner in each of five categories.

Top-selling vehicles:
 Ford F-Series
 Chevrolet Silverado
 Ford Explorer

10Best Cars
Price cap: $62,000

5Best Trucks

2002
Top-selling cars:
 Ford F-Series
 Chevrolet Silverado
 Toyota Camry

10Best Cars
Price cap: $66,000

5Best Trucks

2003

10Best Cars
Price cap: $66,000

5Best Trucks

2004

10Best Cars
Price cap: $69,000

5Best Trucks

2005

10Best Cars
Price cap: $70,000

For 2005 and 2006, the magazine named one winner in each category.

5Best Trucks

2006

10Best Cars
Price cap: $70,000

5Best Trucks

2007

10Best Cars
Price cap: $71,000

5Best Trucks

2008

10Best Cars
Price cap: $72,000

5Best Trucks

2009

10Best Cars
Price cap: $71,000

Beginning with the 2009 list, Car and Driver considered the Porsche Boxster and Cayman to be the same car.

"Dishonorable Mention"
In conjunction with the 2009 10Best Cars list, Car and Driver issued a list of what it called "The 10 Most Embarrassing Award Winners in Automotive History", spotlighting cars previously honored by a major automotive magazine (including CD itself) that, with the passage of time, it considered to be anything but award-worthy.

2010

10Best Cars
Price cap: $80,000

2011

10Best Cars
Price cap: $80,000
This year marks the first appearance of an electrically powered car, the Volt, as well as the first appearance of a Korean automaker, Hyundai, on C&D 10Best.

2012

10Best Cars
Price cap: $80,000

2013

10Best Cars
Price cap: $80,000

2014

10Best Cars
Price cap: $80,000

2015

10Best Cars
Price cap: $80,000

2016

10Best Cars
Price cap: $80,000

2017

10Best Cars

10Best Trucks and SUVs

2018

10Best Cars

10Best Trucks and SUVs

2019

10Best Cars

$90,000 base-price cap

10Best Trucks and SUVs

2020

10Best Cars and Trucks
Beginning with the 2020 list, SUVs and trucks are no longer separate

2021

10Best Cars and Trucks
The 2021 10Best list was released on November 18, 2020. Every car from the 2020 list returns, with the exception of the Jeep Gladiator. The Genesis GV80 makes its first appearance on the list.

2022

10Best Cars and Trucks
The 2022 10Best list was released on November 17, 2021.

2023

10Best Cars
The 2023 10Best Cars list was released on December 19, 2022.

10Best Trucks and SUVs 
The 2023 10Best Trucks and SUVs list was released on January 17, 2023.

See also 

 List of motor vehicle awards

References

Motor vehicle awards